The Chinese ambassador in Malé is the official representative of the Government in Beijing to the Government of the Maldives.

List of representatives

References 

 
Maldives
China